Amanita proxima is a species of Amanita from France, Italy, and Spain. It is poisonous.

References

External links
 
 

proxima